Lac qui Parle is a lake in Minnesota.

Lac qui Parle may also refer to:
Lac qui Parle County, Minnesota
Lac qui Parle Township, Lac qui Parle County, Minnesota
Lac qui Parle, Minnesota
Lac qui Parle Mission
Lac qui Parle River
Lac qui Parle State Park

See also
Historic Lac qui Parle County, Minnesota